VIPS or Vips may stand for:
 Vivekananda Institute of Professional Studies, a college located in New Delhi.
 VIPS (software) image processing software
 Veteran Intelligence Professionals for Sanity, a group of current and former officials of the United States Intelligence Community
 Volunteers in Police Service, a volunteer program that provides volunteer assistance to local police
 VIPs (film), a 2011 Brazilian film
"VIPS", an episode of Squid Game
 VIP's (American restaurant), a former restaurant chain based in Salem, Oregon, U.S.
 VIPS (South Korean restaurant), a restaurant chain based in South Korea
 Vips (Mexican restaurant), a restaurant chain owned by Alsea, previously owned by Walmart de México
 Jüri Vips, Estonian racing driver

See also 
 VIP (disambiguation)